Kerjean may refer to:

People
 Germaine Kerjean (1893–1975), French actress
 Jean-Yves Kerjean (born 1958), French footballer

Places
 Château de Kerjean, Finistère, Brittany, France